Letan is an unincorporated community in Box Butte County, Nebraska, United States.

History
Letan was a station on the Chicago, Burlington and Quincy Railroad.

References

Populated places in Box Butte County, Nebraska
Unincorporated communities in Nebraska